Adult Contemporary is a chart published by Billboard ranking the top-performing songs in the United States in the adult contemporary music (AC) market.  In 2003, eight different songs topped the chart in 52 issues of the magazine, based on weekly airplay data from radio stations compiled by Nielsen Broadcast Data Systems.

In the first issue of Billboard of the new year, the number one song was Josh Groban's rendition of the 19th century Christmas song "O Holy Night", which was in its second week atop the chart.  It held the top spot for a single week in 2003 before being replaced by "Cry" by country singer Faith Hill.  Five of the year's eight chart-toppers featured female vocalists, including "Beautiful", which gave pop singer Christina Aguilera her first AC number one.  The song had been considered for release as the first single from Aguilera's album Stripped, but was passed over in favor of the uptempo, sexually-charged song "Dirrty".  When that single performed poorly, "Beautiful", a ballad with themes of personal acceptance and inner beauty, was released and went on to become one of the singer's signature tracks.  None of 2003's AC number ones topped Billboards all-genre chart, the Hot 100; Aguilera's "Beautiful" came the closest, peaking at number 2.  In 2003 the top spot on the Hot 100 was almost exclusively occupied by R&B and hip hop acts such as Beyoncé and 50 Cent.

In the issue of Billboard dated June 7, Uncle Kracker reached the top spot on the AC listing with his rendition of "Drift Away", featuring additional vocals by Dobie Gray, who had achieved the biggest hit of his career with his version of the song in 1973.  It was the first AC number one for Kracker, who had launched a solo career as a singer in 2000 after performing as the backing DJ for rap rock star Kid Rock.  Released as the lead single from Kracker's second solo album No Stranger to Shame, his version of "Drift Away" topped the AC listing for 23 consecutive weeks, keeping it atop the chart into November.  It would ultimately achieve a total of 28 weeks at number one, a new record for the AC chart which would stand until 2019 when it was broken by the band Maroon 5.  Despite this level of success, however, it would prove to be Kracker's only AC number one.  The year's final AC number one was "Unwell" by the band Matchbox Twenty.

Chart history

See also
2003 in music
List of artists who reached number one on the U.S. Adult Contemporary chart

References

2003
United States Adult Contemporary
2003 in American music